Tainonia is a genus of Caribbean cellar spiders that was first described by B. A. Huber in 2000.

Species
 it contains five species, found only on Hispaniola:
Tainonia bayahibe Huber & Astrin, 2009 – Hispaniola
Tainonia cienaga Huber & Astrin, 2009 – Hispaniola
Tainonia samana Huber & Astrin, 2009 – Hispaniola
Tainonia serripes (Simon, 1893) (type) – Hispaniola
Tainonia visite Huber & Astrin, 2009 – Hispaniola

See also
 List of Pholcidae species

References

Araneomorphae genera
Pholcidae
Spiders of the Caribbean
Arthropods of the Dominican Republic